Frøya Idrettslag is a Norwegian sports club based in Laksevåg, Bergen. Founded in 1928, it has sections for association football and basketball. The club's colours are orange and yellow.

Football
The football section, Frøya Fotball, played in the Norwegian Third Division in 2001, 2004–2008 and 2014. It plays its home matches at Frøya Idrettspark. In 2021, they won promotion back to the Third Division.

References

Sports clubs in Norway
Football clubs in Norway
Sport in Bergen
Association football clubs established in 1928
1928 establishments in Norway